East China Normal University Press (also referred to as ECNU Press or ECNUP) is the publishing division of East China Normal University. Its headquarters are in Shanghai, and has a Beijing branch.

The ECNU Press is founded in 1957 in Shanghai. Before the Chinese economic reform in the 1980s, it was one of the only two university presses existed in China (the other being the China Renmin University Press).

As of 2008, its total income reached 588 million RMB. This total ranked ECNUP the 14th among the 573 publishers in China.

External links
Official website

Book publishing companies of China
Mass media in Shanghai
Companies based in Shanghai
Publishing companies established in 1957
University presses of China
East China Normal University
Chinese companies established in 1957